Okakarara Senior Secondary School is a secondary school located in Okakarara in the Otjozondjupa of central Namibia. The school started operating in 1973 and  had 595 learners.

References

Schools in Otjozondjupa Region
Educational institutions established in 1973
1973 establishments in South West Africa